Westchester, Nova Scotia  may refer to:

 Westchester Mountain, Nova Scotia, a community in Cumberland County
 Westchester Station, Nova Scotia a railway point and community in Cumberland County
 Westchester Valley, Nova Scotia a locality in Cumberland County